The Chelsea Waterworks Company was a London waterworks company founded in 1723 which supplied water to many central London locations throughout the 18th and 19th centuries until its functions were taken over by the Metropolitan Water Board in 1904.

The company was established "for the better supplying the City and Liberties of Westminster and parts adjacent with water"  and received a Royal Charter on 8 March 1723. The company created extensive ponds in the area bordering Chelsea and Pimlico using water from the tidal Thames. These were to form the basis of the Grosvenor Canal which was opened to traffic in 1825. By the 19th century there were complaints about the quality of the water they were drawing from the River Thames, and in 1829, under engineer James Simpson the company became the first in the country to install a slow sand filtration system to purify the water. 

The Metropolis Water Act of 1852 prohibited the extraction of water for household purposes from the River Thames below Teddington Lock. The company moved to Seething Wells above the lock at Surbiton in 1856  becoming the last water company to move their inlets above the polluted tidal water zone. The site was adjacent to the Lambeth Waterworks Company, who had already moved there and who also employed Simpson. The vacated site at Pimlico was used by the railway companies to build lines into west London and London Victoria Station was built on the site of much of the Grosvenor Canal basin. 

The inlets at Seething Wells sucked up too much mud with the water because of turbulence caused by the River Mole, River Ember and The Rythe. The Chelsea Waterworks Company attempted to build works opposite Hampton Court but followed the Lambeth Waterworks Company to a new installation at Molesey in 1875 where the Molesey Reservoirs were built. Both companies were incorporated into the Metropolitan Water Board in 1902.

References

Companies established in 1723
London water infrastructure
History of the City of Westminster
History of the City of London
Former water company predecessors of Thames Water
1723 establishments in England
1902 disestablishments in England
British companies disestablished in 1902
British companies established in 1723